2012 is the second album by American hip hop duo 1982, composed of Statik Selektah and Termanology. Guest appearances include Mac Miller, Bun B, Shawn Stockman (of Boyz II Men), Roc Marciano, Havoc (of Mobb Deep), Freddie Gibbs, Crooked I and Lil' Fame (of M.O.P).

Track listing
All songs produced by Statik Selektah.

Samples
"2012" contains a sample of "I'm So Glad There's You" by Perry & Sanlin.
"Lights Down" contains a sample of "To Make You Happy" by Tommy McGee.
"Up Every Night" contains samples from "Me And My Friend" by John Hambrick, "Worried Over You" by Eldridge Holmes and "Poison" by BBD.
"Happy Days" contains a sample of "I Feel So Good Again" by The Moments.
"Too Long" contains a sample of "Rain, Rain Go Away" by Bob Azzam.
"Thug Poets" contains samples from "Space Dance" by Oliver Sain, "Leroy the Magician" by Gary Burton and "Nas Is Like" by Nas.
"Right Now" contains a sample of "Right Now" by Gladys McFadden and the Loving Sisters.
"Everything" contains a sample of "Use It" by Randy Brown.
"Hard to Forget" contains samples from "He Said Goodbye" by Eleanor Mills and "Get Out of My Life" by Chuck Jackson.
"Live It Up" contains a sample of "Offer I Can't Refuse" by Klymaxx.
"Time Ticking" contains a sample of "Kissing My Love" by Afrique.

References

External links
  UGHH, 2012

2012 albums
Statik Selektah albums
Termanology albums
Albums produced by Statik Selektah